In mathematics and information theory of probability, a sigma-martingale is a semimartingale with an integral representation.  Sigma-martingales were introduced by C.S. Chou and M. Emery in 1977 and 1978.   In financial mathematics, sigma-martingales appear in the fundamental theorem of asset pricing as an equivalent condition to no free lunch with vanishing risk (a no-arbitrage condition).

Mathematical definition 
An -valued stochastic process  is a sigma-martingale if it is a semimartingale and there exists an -valued martingale M and an M-integrable predictable process  with values in  such that

References 

Martingale theory